Princess Sharada Shah of Nepal or Sharada Rajya Lakshmi Devi Shah (February 2, 1942 – June 1, 2001) was the middle daughter of King Mahendra of Nepal. Princess Sharada and her husband, Kumar Khadga, were two of the ten members of the Nepalese royal family killed in the Nepalese royal massacre.

Life

Princess Sharada was the second daughter of King Mahendra and his first wife, Crown Princess Indra.

Name Sharada means "Goddess of Art and Knowledge". 

Princess Sharada was educated at Loreto Convent, Darjeeling and Tribhuvan University. She was active in social welfare activities and was involved with children's welfare activities. Princess Sharada was affiliated with the Nepalese Red Cross Society, the Disaster Relief Subcommittee, and the Child Welfare Subcommittee, among other organizations. In 1971, she founded the SOS Village-Nepal, and was its chairperson. 

Princess Sharada married Kumar Khadga Bikram Shah (1939–2001) on 29 May 1965 in Kathmandu. His ancestors were the rajas of Jumla in the far west of Nepal. He was a well-known academic and writer, and they had three sons:
 Brigadier General Bikash Bikram Shah: First married to Sheeba Shivangini Singh, a writer. Later they divorced, and he married Priyadarshini Pande, a granddaughter of Sardar Bhim Bahadur Pande, a member of aristocratic Pande family. 
 Deebas Bikram Shah, Convener:  He married Preeti Rajya Lakshmi.
 Ashish Bikram Shah: He married Pramada Rajya Lakshmi, a social activist, daughter of Prabhat Shamsher Jang Bahadur Rana and his wife, Neera Rajya Lakshmi, and granddaughter of Nir Shumsher Jung Bahadur Rana and his second wife, Bimala Rajya Lakshmi. Later they divorced.

Both Princess Sharada and Kumar Khadga were killed in the Nepalese royal massacre on June 1, 2001.

Honours 
National Honours
 Member of the Order of Gorkha Dakshina Bahu, 1st class (13 April 1972).
 King Mahendra Investiture Medal (2 May 1956).
 King Birendra Investiture Medal (24 February 1975).
 Commemorative Silver Jubilee Medal of King Birendra (31 January 1997).

Foreign Honours
  : Dame Grand Cordon of the Order of the Precious Crown (16 May 1978).
  : Dame Grand Cross of the Order of Isabella the Catholic (17 September 1983).

Ancestry

References

1942 births
2001 deaths
2001 murders in Asia
20th-century Nepalese people
21st-century Nepalese people
20th-century Nepalese women
21st-century Nepalese women
Female murder victims
Nepalese princesses
People murdered in Nepal
Murdered royalty
Nepalese murder victims
Tribhuvan University alumni
Members of the Order of Gorkha Dakshina Bahu, First Class
Grand Cordons of the Order of the Precious Crown
Recipients of the Order of Isabella the Catholic
Knights Grand Cross of the Order of Isabella the Catholic
20th-century Nepalese nobility
Nepalese Hindus